Perfect is a Canadian documentary film, directed by Jérémie Battaglia and released in 2016. The film profiles Canada's synchronized swimming team as the prepare for the 2016 Summer Olympics in Rio de Janeiro.

The film had selected theatrical screenings in July 2016 before being broadcast on television, both in French as an episode of the Ici Radio-Canada Télé documentary series 1001 vies and in English as an episode of the CBC Television documentary series Firsthand.

The film received two Prix Iris nominations at the 19th Quebec Cinema Awards in 2017, for Best Documentary Film and Best Cinematography in a Documentary (Battaglia).

References

External links
 

2016 films
2016 documentary films
Canadian sports documentary films
Quebec films
Films about Olympic swimming and diving
Synchronized swimming films
2010s Canadian films